Hajjiabad-e Shureh Chaman (also Romanized as Ḩājjīābād-e Shūreh Chaman or Ḩājīābād-e Shūreh Chaman; also known as Ḩājjīābād) is a village in Vardasht Rural District, in the Central District of Semirom County, Isfahan Province, Iran. At the 2006 census, its population was 30, in 8 families.

References 

Populated places in Semirom County